Andriasa contraria is a moth of the family Sphingidae. It is known from tropical Africa, including Kenya, Cameroon and South Africa. It is a very variable species and is common in all habitats except deserts and high mountains.

The length of the forewings is 25–31 mm for males. The females are larger and have longer and narrower wings. The forewing upperside ground colour for males varies from very pale buff to yellowish grey or reddish buff. There are numerous irregular transverse lines ranging from highly conspicuous in some individuals to almost absent in others. The discal spot varies from almost absent to very large and conspicuous (form stigmatica). The forewing upperside marking for females is similar to and as variable as the male, but the ground colour is darker and reddish buff to dark reddish brown.

The larvae have been recorded feeding on the leaves of Spathodea campanulata. Other recorded food plants include Newboldia and Markhamia species.

Subspecies
Andriasa contraria contraria (South Africa to Tanzania, East Africa and Ethiopia)
Andriasa contraria diffusus (Rothschild & Jordan, 1910) (Eritrea)
Andriasa contraria submarginalis (Walker, 1865) (West Africa to the Congo, Uganda and west Kenya)
Andriasa contraria suffusa (Walker, 1869) (Cameroon)

References

Smerinthini
Moths described in 1856
Moths of Africa